The Batchelor Prize is an award presented once every four years by the International Union of Theoretical and Applied Mechanics (IUTAM) for outstanding research in fluid dynamics. The prize of $25,000 is sponsored by the Journal of Fluid Mechanics and presented at the International Congress of Theoretical and Applied Mechanics (ICTAM).  The research recognised by the Prize will normally have been published during the ten-year period prior to the award to ensure that the work is of current interest.

The award is named in honour of George Batchelor, an Australian applied mathematician and fluid dynamicist.

Recipients
Source: IUTAM
2020: Alexander Smits, Princeton University
2016: Raymond E. Goldstein, University of Cambridge
2012: Detlef Lohse
2008: Howard A. Stone

See also
 List of physics awards
 List of prizes named after people

References

Physics awards
Awards established in 2008